is a junction passenger railway station  located in the city of   Amagasaki Hyōgo Prefecture, Japan. It is operated by the private transportation company Hanshin Electric Railway.While this station is situated relatively close to the station of the same name that is operated by JR West, passengers transferring between these two stations must use buses to transfer between trains.

Lines
It is also a terminus for the 10.1 kilometer Hanshin Namba Line.

Layout
The station consists of four elevated island platforms serving two tracks, with Track 2 sharing platforms with both Tracks 1 and 3, and Track 5 sharing platforms with both Tracks 4 and 6.  The ticket gates are located on the first floor, and the platforms are on the 2nd floor.

Platforms

Before extension of the Hanshin Namba Line
The repair of the station was started in 2003 for the extension of the Hanshin Namba Line and completed on March 20, 2009.

until November 11, 2006
The station consisted of five tracks and three island platforms, with Track 4 sharing platforms with both Tracks 3 and 6.

November 12, 2006 - March 16, 2007
The station consisted of five tracks and three island platforms, with Track 5 (former Track 4) sharing platforms with both Tracks 4 (former Track 3) and 6.  A new platform was under construction in the north of Track 1.  Track 4 became used for the Nishi-Osaka Line trains while Tracks 5 and 6 for the Main Line westbound trains.

March 17, 2007 - February 1, 2008
The station consisted of five tracks and three island platforms, with Track 5 sharing platforms with both Track 4 and 6.  A track was situated in the north of the completed platform and assigned as Track 1.  Former Track 1 was renumbered Track 2 and the former platform in the south of present Track 2 was closed.

February 2, 2008 - March 19, 2009
The station consisted of five tracks and three island platforms, with Track 2 sharing platforms with both Tracks 1 and 3.  The repair of the platform serving Tracks 2 and 3 was completed and the trains of the Nishi-Osaka Line left from Track 3.

Surroundings

Hanshin Railway Amagasaki Depot, Amagasaki Repairing Area
Amagasaki Central Park
Abagasaki-chuo, Sanwa, Deyashiki Shopping Street

Buses
Hanshin Bus
Amagasaki City Bus
Hankyu Bus

Adjacent stations

|-

All rapid express trains pass Chidoribashi, Dempo, Fuku, Dekijima, and Daimotsu every day from March 20, 2012.

History 
Amagasaki Station was opened on April 12, 1905 with the opening of the Hanshin Main Line

Passenger statistics
In fiscal 2019, the station was used by an average of 54,487 passengers daily

Surrounding area
Amagasaki Castle
Amagasaki Central Park

See also
List of railway stations in Japan

References

External links

 Station website 

Railway stations in Japan opened in 1905
Railway stations in Hyōgo Prefecture
Hanshin Main Line
Amagasaki